The Geneva Point Center is a historic summer camp and conference center in Moultonborough, New Hampshire, on Lake Winnipesaukee, and is the name of the non-profit organization which currently owns it. It was founded in 1919, with the site being purchased by the International Sunday School Association to serve as "an eastern site for its Boys' and Girls' Camps." It has many facilities and accommodations of different types, along with waterfront swimming and boating facilities on the lake. It can hold conferences, camp groups, family groups and other events. The complex includes many historic buildings, including the Winnipesaukee Inn.

The camp has employed many international interns over the years; Akoa Mongo Kara was one, and David Sibande, a Presbyterian minister of Malawi, was another.

The name "Geneva Point Center" was adopted in 1966.

It was owned by the International Sunday School Association, which merged with the International Council of Religious Education (ICRE) in 1922. The ICRE became part of the National Council of Churches of Christ of America, which later changed names to the National Council of Churches. The Geneva Point Center, Inc., was formed as a nonprofit organization in about 1986, took ownership of the camp in 1986, and continues to operate the center.

In the 1930s, there were as many as 72 summer camps in the Lakes Region.

The stately Winnipesaukee Inn was once the grand barn of a chicken farm. The barn was converted in 1896.

References

External links
Official website

Tourist attractions in Carroll County, New Hampshire
Non-profit organizations based in New Hampshire